Psephite (Greek: psephos, "pebble") is either a sediment or sedimentary rock composed of fragments that are coarser than sand and which are enclosed in a matrix that varies in kind and amount. It is equivalent to a rudite. Shingle, gravel, breccia, and especially conglomerate, would all be considered psephites. It is equivalent to the Latin-derived term rudite. Psephite is more commonly used for a metamorphosed rudite.

Pettijohn  gives the following descriptive terms based on grain size, avoiding the use of terms such as "clay" or "argillaceous", which carry an implication of chemical composition:

References

Sedimentary rocks